Lyes Boukria (born 9 September 1981 in Algiers) is an Algerian football player who is currently playing as a defender for ES Sétif in the Algerian Ligue Professionnelle 1.

References

1981 births
Algerian footballers
Living people
Footballers from Algiers
JS Kabylie players
NA Hussein Dey players
CR Belouizdad players
ES Sétif players
Algerian Ligue Professionnelle 1 players
Association football defenders
WA Boufarik players
21st-century Algerian people